The following is the list of squads for each of the 16 teams that competed in the men's basketball tournament at the 1972 Summer Olympics.

Group A

Australia

The following players represented Australia:

 Anatoli Koltuniewicz
 Brian Kerle
 Eddie Palubinskas
 Glenn Marsland
 Ian Watson
 Ken James
 Perry Crosswhite
 Peter Byrne
 Ray Tomlinson
 Richard Duke
 Tom Bender
 Bill Wyatt

Brazil

The following players represented Brazil:

 Marquinhos
 Adilson
 Mosquito
 Hélio Rubens Garcia
 Zé Geraldo
 José Aparecido
 Dodi
 Luiz Menon
 Radvilas Gorauskas
 Fransergio
 Bira

Cuba

The following players represented Cuba:

 Juan Domecq
 Ruperto Herrera
 Juan Roca
 Pedro Chappé
 José Miguel Álvarez
 Rafael Cañizares
 Conrado Pérez
 Miguel Calderón
 Tomás Herrera
 Oscar Varona
 Alejandro Urgellés
 Franklin Standard

Czechoslovakia

The following players represented Czechoslovakia:

 Jan Blažek
 Jan Bobrovský
 Jiří Balaštík
 Jiří Konopásek
 Jiří Pospíšil
 Jiří Růžička
 Jiří Zedníček
 Jiří Zídek
 Kamil Brabenec
 Petr Novický
 Zdeněk Douša
 Zdeněk Kos

Egypt

The following players represented Egypt:

 Sherif Fouad Aboulkheir
 Ahmed Abdel Hamid El-Saharty
 Awad Abdel Nabi
 Sayed Tewfik El-Sayed
 Adel Ibrahim Ismail
 Fahti Mohamed Kamel
 Mohamed Essam Khaled
 Kamal Kamel Mohammed
 Talaat Guenidi
 Ismail Selim Mohamed
 El-Sayed Abdel Hamid Mobarak

Japan

The following players represented Japan:

 Atsushi Somatomo
 Hirofumi Numata
 Katsuhiko Sugita
 Kazufumi Sakai
 Kenji Soda
 Kunihiko Yokoyama
 Masatomo Taniguchi
 Mineo Yoshikawa
 Nobuo Chigusa
 Nobuo Hattori
 Satoshi Mori
 Shigeaki Abe

Spain

The following players represented Spain:

 Carmelo Cabrera
 Cliff Luyk
 Enrique Margall
 Francisco Buscató
 Gonzalo Sagi-Vela
 Jesús Iradier
 Juan Antonio Corbalán
 Luis Santillana
 Miguel Estrada
 Rafael Rullán
 Vicente Ramos
 Wayne Brabender

United States

The following players represented the United States:

 Kenny Davis
 Doug Collins
 Tom Henderson
 Mike Bantom
 Bobby Jones
 Dwight Jones
 Jim Forbes
 Jim Brewer
 Tommy Burleson
 Tom McMillen
 Kevin Joyce
 Ed Ratleff

Group B

Italy

The following players represented Italy:

 Dino Meneghin
 Giorgio Giomo
 Giulio Iellini
 Giuseppe Brumatti
 Ivan Bisson
 Luigi Serafini
 Marino Zanatta
 Massimo Masini
 Mauro Cerioni
 Ottorino Flaborea
 Pierluigi Marzorati
 Renzo Bariviera

Philippines

The following players represented the Philippines:

 Jun Papa
 Danny Florencio
 Ed Ocampo
 Freddie Webb
 Jimmy Mariano
 Manny Paner
 Marte Samson
 Ciso Bernardo
 Ricardo Cleofas
 Rogelio Melencio
 Rosalio Martirez
 William Adornado

Poland

The following players represented Poland:

 Andrzej Kasprzak
 Andrzej Seweryn
 Eugeniusz Durejko
 Franciszek Niemiec
 Grzegorz Korcz
 Jan Dolczewski
 Janusz Cegliński
 Mieczysław Łopatka
 Piotr Langosz
 Ryszard Białowąs
 Waldemar Kozak
 Andrzej Pasiorowski

Puerto Rico

The following players represented Puerto Rico:

 Earl Brown
 Billy Baum
 Héctor Blondet
 Jimmy Thordsen
 Joe Hatton
 Mariano Ortiz
 Neftalí Rivera
 Raymond Dalmau
 Ricky Calzada
 Rubén Rodríguez
 Teo Cruz
 Mickey Coll

Senegal

The following players represented Senegal:

 Abdourahmane N'Diaye
 Alioune Badara Guèye
 Assane Thiam
 Babacar Seck
 Boubacar Traoré
 Cheikh Amadou Fall
 Joseph Diandy
 Doudas Leydi Camara
 Moustafa Diop
 Papa Malick Diop
 Pierre Martin Sagna
 Sylvestre Lopis

Soviet Union

The following players represented the Soviet Union:

 Anatoli Polivoda
 Sergei Belov
 Zurab Sakandelidze
 Gennadi Volnov
 Sergei Kovalenko
 Modestas Paulauskas
 Alzhan Zharmukhamedov
 Aleksandr Boloshev
 Ivan Edeshko
 Mikheil Korkia
 Ivan Dvorny
 Alexander Belov

West Germany

The following players represented West Germany:

 Dieter Kuprella
 Dietrich Keller
 Hans-Jörg Krüger
 Helmut Uhlig
 Holger Geschwindner
 Joachim Linnemann
 Jochen Pollex
 Jürgen Wohlers
 Karl Ampt
 Klaus Weinand
 Norbert Thimm
 Rainer Pethran

Yugoslavia

The following players represented Yugoslavia:

 Blagoja Georgievski
 Damir Šolman
 Dragan Kapičić
 Dragutin Čermak
 Krešimir Ćosić
 Ljubodrag Simonović
 Milun Marović
 Miroljub Damjanović
 Nikola Plećaš
 Ratomir Tvrdić
 Vinko Jelovac
 Žarko Knežević

References

1972 Summer Olympics